Sirens of the Sea is the debut album by the British vocal trance group Above & Beyond presents OceanLab, released on 21 July 2008 through Anjunabeats.

On 8 June 2009 a remix edition of the album was released, Sirens of the Sea Remixed, which features both previously released and new remixes.

Track listing
All songs produced by Jono Grant, Tony McGuinness, Paavo Siljamäki and Justine Suissa. Additional beat production on "Miracle" by Bob Bradley.

Credits and personnel
Jono Grant – songwriter, producer, performer, artwork
Tony McGuinness – songwriter, producer, performer, artwork
Paavo Siljamäki – songwriter, producer, performer, artwork
Justine Suissa – songwriter, producer, performer, vocals, artwork
Bob Bradley – additional beat production (track 5)
Miles Showell – mastering
Zena Holloway – underwater photographs of Justine Suissa
Phyllis Cohen – make-up
Alexia Somerville – styling
Chris Davison – photograph of OceanLab
David Struwig – hair
Marc Bicker – photo post production
Stylorouge – photo post production
James Grant – management
Jess Roe – label manager
Andy Bonwick – artwork assistance
Michael Farrell – label assistant for Anjunabeats.
Matt Learmouth – UK press

Credits adapted from Sirens of the Sea liner notes.

Sirens of the Sea Remixed

References

External links 
Listing for Sirens of the Sea at Discogs

2008 debut albums
Above & Beyond (band) albums
Anjunabeats albums